Year 1177 (MCLXXVII) was a common year starting on Saturday (link will display the full calendar) of the Julian calendar.

Events 
 January–December 
 January – Eystein Meyla, leader of the Birkebeiner in Norway, is killed. Sverre Sigurdson (Later, King Sverre I, of Norway) becomes the new leader.
 January 13 – Leopold V becomes Duke of Austria.
 March – Treaty of Venice: Frederick I Barbarossa acknowledges Alexander III as Pope, after a diplomatic mediation by Venetian doge Sebastiano Ziani.
 March 16 – The Spanish Award is signed and witnessed by, among others, Robert de Stuteville III and John of Greenford
August 1 – The Holy Roman Empire renounces any claims on the territory of Rome.
September 27 – Pope Alexander III sends a letter to Prester John, believing he is real.
November 25 – Battle of Montgisard: Baldwin IV of Jerusalem and Raynald of Chatillon defeat Saladin.

 Date unknown 
 During the third year of the Angen era in Japan, a fire devastates Kyoto.
 During the winter, the Estonians attack Pskov.
 Casimir II overthrows his brother Mieszko III the Old, to become High Duke of Poland.
 The Cham sack the Khmer capital of Angkor Wat. The date is disputed.
 Moscow is burned down by Gleb I, prince of Ryazan, and its inhabitants are killed.
 A civil war breaks out in the Republic of Florence, between the Uberti Family and their consular opponent.
 Puigcerdà is founded by Alfonso II of Aragon.
 Byland Abbey is established on its final site in Yorkshire, England, by the Cistercians.
 Abbas Benedictus becomes abbot of Peterborough in England.
 Roger de Moulins becomes Grand Master of the Knights Hospitaller.
 possible date – Richard FitzNeal begins to write his treatise Dialogus de Scaccario ("Dialogue concerning the Exchequer") in England.

Births 
 February/March – Philip of Swabia, rival of Otto IV, Holy Roman Emperor (d. 1208)
 August – Baldwin V, King of Jerusalem (d. 1186)
 Marie of Oignies, French beguin (d. 1213)
 Sylvester Gozzolini, Italian founder of the Sylvestrines (d. 1267)

Deaths 
 January 13 – Henry II, Duke of Austria (b. 1107)
 January – Eystein Meyla, leader of the Birkebeiner in Norway. (b. 1157)
 June – William of Montferrat, Count of Jaffa and Ascalon, father of Baldwin V of Jerusalem (b. early 1140s)
 probable – Hugh Bigod, 1st Earl of Norfolk (b. 1095)

References